The Ministry of Women Affairs, Community, Small and Medium Enterprises Development is a government ministry, responsible for gender and community issues in Zimbabwe. The most recent minister was Olivia Muchena since February 13, 2009 and the deputy minister was Evelyn Masaiti.

It was established in 2005 and was headed by Opa Muchinguri from its inception until January 3, 2009, when she was dismissed from office. Sithembiso Nyoni gained the portfolio of the office until Muchena was sworn into office.

On 30 November, incumbent President Emmerson Mnangagwa appointed Sithembiso Nyoni as the minister for Women's affairs as well as for Youth affairs

References

Government of Zimbabwe
Society of Zimbabwe
Zimbabwe
Zimbabwe, Women's Affairs
2005 establishments in Zimbabwe
Women in Zimbabwe
Women's rights in Zimbabwe